Player Piano is the second studio album of Dayve Hawke, under the alias of Memory Tapes. It was released July 5, 2011.  The cover art features an image of a gouache painting by Kazuki Takamatsu.

Reception

Player Piano has a review score of 6.8 on the website AnyDecentMusic? and a metacritic score of 67 out of 100, indicating generally favorable reviews.

Track listing

Notes

2011 albums
Memory Tapes albums